Babu Passenger is a passenger train operated daily by Pakistan Railways between Lahore and Wazirabad.

Route 
 Lahore Junction–Wazirabad Junction via Karachi–Peshawar Railway Line

Station stops

Equipment 
Babu Passenger offers economy class seating with berth facilities.

References 

Named passenger trains of Pakistan
Passenger trains in Pakistan